Eumysia semicana is a species of snout moth in the genus Eumysia. It was described by Carl Heinrich in 1956. It is found in California, United States.

References

Moths described in 1956
Phycitinae